Sharkey is a surname of Irish origin. Notable people with the surname include:

 Bill Sharkey (1873–1946), Australian rules footballer
 Brendan Sharkey (born 1962), American politician
 Catherine Sharkey (born c. 1970), law professor
 Ed Sharkey (born 1927), American former National Football League player
 Eddie Sharkey (born 1936), American professional wrestling trainer and former wrestler
 Emma Augusta Sharkey (1858–1902), American writer
 Feargal Sharkey (born 1958), lead singer of the pop punk band The Undertones
 Heather J. Sharkey (born 1967), American historian
 Jack Sharkey (1902–1994), American heavyweight boxing champion
 Jack Sharkey (footballer) (1874–1961), Australian rules footballer
 Jackie Sharkey (1897–1970), Italian-born American boxer
 James A. Sharkey (born 1945), Irish historian and diplomat
 Jerry Sharkey (1942–2014), American historic preservationist and historian 
 Jim Sharkey (1934–2014), Scottish footballer
 Joe Sharkey, columnist for The New York Times
 John Sharkey, Baron Sharkey (born 1947), British politician
 Jonathon Sharkey (born 1964), American professional wrestler and perennial candidate
 Kathleen Sharkey (born 1990), American field hockey player
 Kevin Sharkey (born 1961), Irish artist
 Lance Sharkey (1898–1967), Australian trade union activist, radical journalist and communist politician
 Michael Sharkey (born 1946), Australian poet, biographer, reviewer and academic
 Nick Sharkey (1943–2015), Scottish footballer
 Noel Sharkey, British computer scientist
 Pat Sharkey (born 1953), former footballer from Northern Ireland
 Patrick Sharkey (boxer) (1931–2016), Irish boxer
 Patrick Sharkey (born c. 1978), American sociologist
 Paul Sharkey (born 1974), former Australian rules footballer
 Ray Sharkey (1952–1993), American actor
 Sarah Sharkey, officer in the Royal Australian Navy
 Seymour Sharkey (1847–1929), British physician
 Tina Sharkey (born 1964), American entrepreneur
 Tom Sharkey (1873–1953), American boxer
 William J. Sharkey (US Navy officer) (1885–1918)
 William J. Sharkey (murderer) (c. 1847–?), convicted murderer and minor New York City politician
 William L. Sharkey (1798–1873), American judge and politician

Fictional characters include:
 Finn Sharkey, in the UK TV series Waterloo Road
 Francis Ethelbert Sharkey, a character in the TV series Voyage to the Bottom of the Sea
 Captain John Sharkey, the main character of Sir Arthur Conan Doyle's 1925 novel The Dealings of Captain Sharkey
 Otto Sharkey, title character of C.P.O. Sharkey, a 1976–1978 American television series, played by Don Rickles
 Tom Sharky, protagonist of the 1981 film Sharky's Machine, played by Burt Reynolds

See also
 Bill Sharky, former member of The Barron Knights, a British humorous pop group

Surnames of Irish origin